Roger-Paul Dechambre (1935 – 8 November 2016) was a French veterinarian and entomologist 
.

Career 
Dechambre attended lhe École nationale vétérinaire d'Alfort, in 1960 gaining a doctorate on the thesis Aspects Primitifs De L’Elevage Du Mouton
. 
He continued his studies at the Université Pierre-et-Marie-Curie at Paris, gaining in 1970 a doctorate on the thesis Effet de groupe et évolution des tumeurs ascitiques chez la souris
.

Roger-Paul Dechambre was the curator at the Museum National d'Histoire Naturelle, Paris à Paris. He produced substantial work on the beetle family Dynastinae.

Publications (extract) 
Most of Dechambre's publications are on the subfamily Dynastinae.

Described species 

 Golofa globulicornis (1975)
 Golofa obliquicornis (1975)
 Golofa spatha (1989)
 Hemicyrthus chazeaui (1982)

 Hemicyrthus costatus (1982)
 Hemicyrthus elongatus (1982)
 Hemicyrthus gutierrezi (1982)
 Paroryctoderus cornutus (1994)

References

External links 
 
 

French entomologists
1935 births
2016 deaths